Fairbridges Attorneys is a South African law firm. The firm, established on 6 November 1812, is the oldest law firm in South Africa and the southern hemisphere. With offices in Johannesburg and Cape Town, The lawfirm has won the PMR.Africa "Diamond Arrow" award for excellence in the small firm category five times: 2009, 2010, 2011, 2013, 2014.

References 

 http://www.fairbridges.co.za/
 http://www.saflii.org

External links 
 www.fairbridges.co.za
 Murfreesboro Attorney

Law firms of South Africa